The following highways are numbered 466:

Canada
Manitoba Provincial Road 466

Japan
 Japan National Route 466

United States
  U.S. Route 466 (former)
  Florida State Road 466 (former)
  Louisiana Highway 466
Louisiana Highway 466-1 (former)
Louisiana Highway 466-2 (former)
Louisiana Highway 466-3 (former)
Louisiana Highway 466-4 (former)
Louisiana Highway 466-5 (former)
Louisiana Highway 466-6 (former)
Louisiana Highway 466-7 (former)
Louisiana Highway 466-8 (former)
Louisiana Highway 466-9 (former) 
Louisiana Highway 466-10 
Louisiana Highway 466-11 (former)
Louisiana Highway 466-12 (former)
Louisiana Highway 466-13 (former)
Louisiana Highway 466-14 (former)
Louisiana Highway 466-15 (former)
Louisiana Highway 466-16 (former)
  Montana Secondary Highway 466
  Pennsylvania Route 466 (former)
  Puerto Rico Highway 466
  Farm to Market Road 466